Kandaga is an administrative ward in Uvinza District of Kigoma Region in Tanzania. 
In 2016 the Tanzania National Bureau of Statistics report there were 26,083 people in the ward, from 23,696 in 2012.

Villages / hamlets 
The ward has 5 villages and 37 hamlets.

 Kalenge
 Hudumani
 Kibingwe
 Kilemba
 Kinombe
 Majengo
 Nyanzali
 Shuza
 Kandaga
 Hudumani
 Kafunzo
 Kagunga A
 Kagunga B
 Kalinzi A
 Kalinzi B
 Nyamponda
 Kazuramimba
 Kidea
 Kilelema A
 Kilelema B
 Kilelema C
 Rubona A
 Rubona B
 Rubona C
 Tambukareli Magharibi
 Tambukareli Mashariki
 Mlela
 Bitale A
 Bitale B
 Ibolelo
 Kataragusa
 Kayana
 Kitelema
 Nyamabuye
 Nyanganga
 Hudumani
 Majengo
 Mibangani A
 Mibangani B
 Mzungwe
 Nyabulamba

References

Wards of Kigoma Region